James Samuel Morton (born 22 April 1999) is an English footballer who plays as a midfielder for Bath City on loan from Bristol City.

He has played professionally in the Football League with loan spells at Forest Green Rovers, Grimsby Town and Gillingham. He has also spent time on loan with Chippenham Town and Bath City.

Career
Morton joined Bristol City aged 14 and progressed through the club's youth system. He was loaned out to Chippenham Town in October 2017 and then Bath City on loan until 13 January 2018, before extending his loan to the end of the season. In the summer of 2018, he re-joined Bath City on loan for the 2018–19 season, and won their 'Goal of the season' award for that season. After signing a four-year deal with Bristol City in summer 2019, Morton joined Forest Green Rovers on a season-long loan, making his EFL League Two debut when he played the entire match against Oldham Athletic on the opening day of the 2019–20 season.

On 30 September 2020, Morton joined Grimsby Town on a season-long loan. On 31 December 2020, following the departure of manager Ian Holloway, Morton and fellow Bristol City team mate Owura Edwards were recalled from their loan spells at Grimsby. Morton made only 4 starts during his time at Blundell Park.

On 1 February 2021, Morton joined League One side Gillingham on loan for the remainder of the 2020-21 season. Morton would only feature once for the Gills, appearing as a 91st minute substitute in a 3–0 home defeat by Lincoln City on 5 February 2021.

In July 2021, Bristol City allowed Morton to join Milton Keynes Dons on trial with a view to a permanent transfer, however after playing in a 7-1 pre-season victory over Coventry City the transfer fell through following a change of management at MK.

On 23 September 2022, Morton returned to National League South club Bath City on loan until the end of the 2022–23 season.

Personal life
Morton is a Christian.

Career statistics

References

External links

1999 births
Living people
Footballers from Bristol
English footballers
Association football midfielders
Bristol City F.C. players
Chippenham Town F.C. players
Bath City F.C. players
Forest Green Rovers F.C. players
Grimsby Town F.C. players
Gillingham F.C. players
English Football League players
National League (English football) players